John Beane ( 1503–1580) was an English politician from York.

Beane was a Member (MP) of the Parliament of England for York in April 1554.

References

Notes

Year of birth unknown
1580 deaths
English MPs 1554
Politicians from York
Members of the Parliament of England for constituencies in Yorkshire
Year of birth uncertain